Jones may refer to:

People and fictional characters
Jones (surname), a common Welsh and English surname
List of people with surname Jones, including fictional characters
Jones (singer), a British singer-songwriter

Arts and entertainment
Jones (Animal Farm), a human character in George Orwell's novel Animal Farm
"Jones" (Law & Order: Criminal Intent), an episode of the TV series
Jones!, a New Zealand television channel
"Jones", a song from the album Certain Things Are Likely by Kissing the Pink

Organisations
Jones Bootmaker, a UK-based footwear retailer
Jones Soda, a brand of soda pop
Jones Sewing Machine Company, a British manufacturer acquired by Brother Industries
L&F Jones, a British retail and hotel company

Places
Jones, Ontario, Canada
Jones, Isabela, Philippines

United States
Jones, Alabama
Jones, Illinois
Jones, Kentucky
Jones, Michigan
Jones, Oklahoma
Jones, West Virginia
Jones Township (disambiguation)

Science and technology
Jones (Martian crater), an impact crater on Mars
Jones (unit), a measure of specific detectivity
Jones calculus, a description of polarization in optics

See also
Jones (slang), an intense craving
Jones of Faerdref Uchaf, a Welsh noble family
Generation Jones, the generation of people born between 1954 and 1965
Justice Jones (disambiguation)
Mr. Jones (disambiguation)
Keeping up with the Joneses (disambiguation)

Human name disambiguation pages
Surnames from given names